Genilson da Rocha Santos (born December 1, 1971) is a former Brazilian football player.

Club statistics

References

External links

1971 births
Living people
Brazilian footballers
J2 League players
Kawasaki Frontale players
Brazilian expatriate footballers
Expatriate footballers in Japan
Association football defenders